Athisaya Manal Matha Shrine (Tamil: "அதிசய மணல் மாதா" | Our Lady of Red Sands) is in southern Thoothukudi district of Tamil Nadu. The shrine belongs to the Sokkan Kudierappu Parish of the Diocese of Tuticorin. The Shrine is surrounded by land masses of red sands and a large number of palm trees. A small lake (known as Tharuvai in by the local people) is also near the shrine. It was once known as Kanakkan Kudieruppu, were lived a number of families in the kingdom of The Pandiyas. It's said that, as a result of the unjust in the kingdom, through a poor widow who was killed by the king, the whole village was covered by red sand by sand storm. It is considered as a punishment given to the people and the king by God. Later in 1798, the church was discovered by a shepherd boy with the help of the people of Sokkan Kudieruppu. 

Today, the Shrine is one of the sixteen Shrines in of the Diocese of Tuticorin. It is administrated by the people of Sokkan Kudieruppu. Saturday devotion is famous in the shrine, receiving visitors from southern Tamil Nadu and from some parts of Kerala, Andra Pradesh and Karnataka visit the shrine. Blessed Holy Meal is served to all the people, irrespective of caste and religion on every first Saturday of the month. Ten days of feast is celebrated every year in the month of September. It starts with the flag-hoisting on the Friday followed by The Feast of the Cross and ends with a grand Holy mass on the tenth day of the feast.

Church history
In the first century AD Saint Thomas spread Christianity in the state of Kerala, on the west coast of India. By preaching about Lord Jesus, he started to draw the Indian people towards Christianity. During that period Saint Thomas started healing many people from deadly diseases. By performing miracles, his fame spread across Kerala and neighbouring Tamil Nadu.

During the first century AD, the southern tip of India was under the regime of the Pandya ruler Kandappa Rasa. The king and his family suffered from various diseases. During this period, he learned of Saint Thomas' miracles through the traders who visited Kerala to sell spices. On hearing about Saint Thomas, the king went to Kerala, described his sufferings, and brought Saint Thomas to Tamil Nadu.

With the blessing of Lord Jesus, Saint Thomas healed the king and his family, to the king's amazement.

Saint Thomas preached Christianity to the king and his followers and they soon started following Christianity. Saint Thomas renamed the King as "Sabor".

As a mark of respect, the king donated 3 cents of land to Saint Thomas to build a church for Mother Mary. As per tradition in those days, Saint Thomas built the church with palm leaves. This piece of land was the first in India to be donated to Christianity.

In this church, Saint Thomas set up a holy cross made of wood and instructed the people to pray at the cross. Saint Thomas marked the letters INRI on the top portion of the cross. The church built on 3 cents of land donated to Saint Thomas is the "Athisaya Manalmatha Church".

St. Xavier's visit
In the 16th century, Saint Francis Xavier started preaching Christianity in India. He started preaching the Holy Bible in the southern part of Tamil Nadu. During that time he was preaching in Manapadu Malai. Saint Francis Xavier learned of the church of Manalmatha in Kanakkan Kudieruppu and he also learned that the Christians in Kanakkan Kudieruppu were all followers of Saint Thomas and he was eager to visit the Athisaya Manalmatha church.

References
Website

Facebook

External links
 Getjar.com: Manal Matha
 Getjar.com: Manal Matha songs

Churches in Tamil Nadu